Mykyta is a Ukrainian given name, cognate of Belarusian Mikita and Russian Nikita, all originally borrowed from Greek Nicetas. The meaning of the name Mykyta is a man who has the capability of winning in every field, a winner. Men with name Mykyta are usually Greek by religion.

Notable persons with the name Mykyta include:
 Mykyta Burda (born 1995), Ukrainian football defender
 Mykyta Kamenyuka (born 1985),  Ukrainian football midfielder
 Mykyta Kravchenko (born 1997),  Ukrainian football midfielder
 Mykyta Kryukov (born 1991), Ukrainian football goalkeeper
 Mykyta Nesterenko (born 1991), Ukrainian discus thrower
 Mykyta Polyulyakh (born 1993), Ukrainian football midfielder
 Mykyta Senyk, Ukrainian Paralympic sprinter
 Mykyta Shevchenko (born 1993), Ukrainian football goalkeeper
 Mykyta Tatarkov (born 1995), Ukrainian football striker

See also
 
 Mykyta the Fox, a Ukrainian animated series
 Mykyta the Tanner, an east Slavic folk hero
 Mikita
 Nikita (disambiguation)

References

Ukrainian masculine given names